Jelena Mladjenović (born 30 May 1997) is an Bosnian volleyball player who has played in Europe and South Korea. 

She currently plays for Daejeon KGC in the Korean V-League.

References

External links

  at Volleybox

1997 births
Living people